Bombe may refer to:
 Bombe (Wolaita), administrative town in Boloso Bombe Woreda of Wolyaita, Ethiopia
 Bombe, British electromechanical computer used to decode German Enigma messages in the Second World War
 Bombe glacée (aka "bombe"), ice cream dish resembling a cannonball
 Bombe Alaska, baked Alaska ice cream dish
 Bombe Gulf, Libya; a protected area in Libya

See also
 
 Bomb (disambiguation)
 Bomba (disambiguation)